Operation Mekong is a 2016 Chinese-Hong Kong crime action film directed by Dante Lam and starring Zhang Hanyu and Eddie Peng. The film is based on the 2011 Mekong River massacre. It was released in China on 30 September 2016 and became one of the highest-grossing films in China.

Plot
A merchant vessel operating in the Mekong River Delta is attacked by bandits, causing the death of 13 people. When a huge amount of drugs is found onboard, Chinese authority teams up with police forces from Thailand, Laos and Myanmar to investigate the case. The movie is inspired by a true event that took place in 2011.

Cast
Zhang Hanyu as Gao Gang 
Eddie Peng as Fang Xinwu 
Feng Wenjuan as Guo Bing  "Aphrodite" 
Sun Chun as Yu Ping
Chen Baoguo as Minister of Public Security Jiang Haifeng 
Liu Xianda as Xie Wenfeng "Icarus" (哪吒 meaning Nezha)
Jonathan Wu Linkai as Kuai Yitong "Hermes"
Zhao Jian as Guo Xu "Poseidon" 
Zhan Liguo  as Fu Baowei "Panoptes" (二郎 meaning Erlangshen)
Shi Zhanjie s Jiang Xing "Ares" (木星 meaning Jupiter)
Wu Xudong as Wild Bull Team Leader
Carl Ng as Pierre
Pawalit Mongkolpisit as Naw Khar
Vithaya Pansringarm as P'Som
Ken Lo as Xing Deng
Ron Weaver as Puja
Ganesh Acharya as Mr Zar
Mandy Wei as Fang Xinwu's girlfriend (cameo)

The members of the operation have aliases: in the Chinese version they are named after deities in Chinese folk religion, while in the English versions the names are changed to deities in Greek mythology.

Production
Production began in September 2015. Shooting locations include China (Beijing and Yunnan), Myanmar, and Thailand but a few scene include HQ task force and another place in Penang,Cameron Highlands Pahang and Perak.

Release
Operation Mekong was released on 30 September 2016. It concerns an incident that occurred in Chiang Saen District of Chiang Rai Province on 5 October 2011 when 13 Chinese crew members from two cargo ships were murdered by a Myanmar drug-trafficking ring.

Thai Prime Minister Prayut Chan-o-cha, responding to news of the film's imminent release, said that the film would be banned in Thailand if it was found to "damage" the country. "I have ordered authorities to check the content of Operation Mekong. If it is damaging, it will be banned," Gen Prayut said. Some believe that the reason for his government's nervousness is that Thai troops, the "elite" anti-drug Pa Muang Task Force, were known to have been at the scene of the massacre. Nine soldiers were arrested, but "...have since disappeared from the justice system." Naw Kham, a Golden Triangle drug kingpin, and his gang were found guilty of attacking the two Chinese cargo ships in collusion with Thai soldiers. He was executed in March 2013 in China along with three accomplices, including a Thai national.

Reception
The film has grossed  at the Chinese box office.

Jessica Kiang of Variety stated that Operation Mekong "hurtles by in an enjoyably giddy, propulsive rush right until the final titles, which dedicate the film to the dead fishermen and detail the fate of the real Naw Kham." Kiang stated that the sense of escapism in the film may be interfered with by the references to real life tragedies.

Awards and nominations

Accolades

References

External links

2016 crime action films
2016 films
Polybona Films films
Chinese crime action films
Action films based on actual events
Films directed by Dante Lam
Films shot in Beijing
Films shot in Thailand
Films shot in Yunnan
Hong Kong crime action films
Crime films based on actual events
2010s Mandarin-language films
2010s Hong Kong films